Smoky Township is one of the thirteen townships of Sherman County, Kansas, United States.  The population was 87 at the 2000 census.

Geography
Located in the southern part of the county, it borders the following townships:
Logan Township — north, west of Itasca Township
Itasca Township — north, east of Logan Township
Washington Township — northeastern corner
Iowa Township — east
Wallace Township, Wallace County — southeast
Sharon Springs Township, Wallace County — south
McPherson Township — west
Lincoln Township — northwest
It lies south of the county seat of Goodland.  There are no communities in the township.

The north fork of the Smoky Hill River flows through Smoky Township.  The Sherman Wildlife Area, with areas devoted to hunting and camping, is centered on a lake in the western part of the township, where the river is dammed.

Transportation
K-27, a north–south highway, is the only significant road in Smoky Township.

Government
Smoky Township is currently inactive; by Kansas law, when a township becomes inactive, its powers and duties revert to the county government.

References

External links
County website

Townships in Sherman County, Kansas
Townships in Kansas